6 Regiment Army Air Corps is the sole Army Reserve regiment of the British Army Air Corps (AAC) falling under the Combat Arm of the British Army. The regiment consists of five Squadrons based around the south of the UK. 6 Regiment provides soldiers trained to assist Joint Helicopter Command on exercise and operations both in the UK and worldwide. The regiment provides support to support and attack helicopter in roles including Aviation Ground crew specialists, Aviation Communication Operators and Aviation Support Officers. The AAC regiment is supported by other Army Reserve elements including Royal Logistic Corps as chefs, Logistics and Supply, Adjutant General Corps as human resource specialists and Royal Army Medical Corps in the form of Combat Medical Technicians.

History
6 Regiment was formed on 2 July 2006 at Bury St Edmunds, Suffolk. It is the only reserves regiment of the Army Air Corps.  The regiment was initially formed as an attack helicopter ground crew regiment, providing attack helicopter support to the regular Army Air Corps regiments at Wattisham. The regiment has since begun training ground crew to work with the Westland Lynx, allowing it to provide general support to the majority of the Army Air Corps.

In 2009 655 Squadron (V) The Scottish Horse joined the regiment.

The Army 2020 and Future Reserves 20 announcements in July 2013 made significant changes to the role and structure of 6 Regiment Army Air Corps.  Those changes were expected to be largely in place by 1 April 2014, with extensive conversion training continuing until approximately 2017.

Unit role
The role of 6 Regiment Army Air Corps is to provide ground support to Army aviation units operating the AgustaWestland Apache and the Lynx Battlefield Utility Helicopter.  6 Regiment Army Air Corps is also capable of providing wider support to all aviation units within the Joint Helicopter Command both on exercise and on operations. More specifically the roles of 6 Regt AAC and its personnel are:

 To have the ability to fight and operate in austere places under difficult and occasionally dangerous conditions.
 To deploy on operations as whole formed teams up to squadron level (130 soldiers) to provide: 
 Refuelling and re-arming teams.
 The operations room teams for the co-ordination and control of aviation operations.
 Specialist helicopter handling teams (HHT) to help ground units (e.g. infantry) operate with aviation.
 Personnel with specific skills to augment regular forces.
 Integration with Regular Army aviation units who operate Apache and Lynx (including Wildcat).
 Capability of working with and supporting tri-service (Royal Navy, Army and Royal Air Force) aviation assets such as Boeing Chinooks, Aerospatiale Pumas, Merlins, Defender 4000s and Aerospatiale Gazelles.

The Army Reserve does not recruit pilots for flying roles.

6 Regiment Army Air Corps previously supplied troops to Operation Herrick, and to Operation Telic.

Structure and locations
From April 2014, 6 Regiment Army Air Corps consists of a Regimental Headquarters (RHQ) and five sub-units:

Regimental Headquarters (RHQ)
 Located at Blenheim Camp, Bury St Edmunds.
Headquarters Squadron, 6 Regiment Army Air Corps. 
	Located at Wattisham Flying Station.
	Provide the administrative, logistical and training support needed to facilitate 6 Regt AAC activities.
No. 675 (The Rifles) Squadron AAC
	Located in Somerset (Taunton and Yeovil)
	Created from the transfer of B Company 6 Rifle Regiment to 6 Regt AAC.
	Paired with 1 Regt AAC in Yeovilton.
	Provide ground support to Wildcat.
	Provide helicopter handling teams.
	Support local community engagement.
No. 677 (Suffolk and Norfolk Yeomanry) Squadron AAC
	Located in East Anglia (Bury St Edmunds, Norwich and Wattisham Flying Station)
	Paired with 3 Regiment AAC in Wattisham.
	Provide ground support to Westland Apaches.
	Where capacity allows: assist 675 Sqn with the provision of helicopter handling teams.
	Support local community engagement.
No. 678 (The Rifles) Squadron AAC
Removed from the regiment in Nov 2021 defence review to be RLC. 
	Located in Buckinghamshire and Bedfordshire (Milton Keynes and Luton)
	Created from the transfer of E company of 7 Rifles, 201 Battery of 100 Regiment Royal Artillery and 1 Sqn 38 Signals Regiment (RBY) Bletchley.
	Paired with 4 Regimemt AAC in Wattisham.
	Provide ground support to Apache.
	Where capacity allows: assist 675 Sqn with the provision of helicopter handling teams.
	Support local community engagement.
No. 679 (The Duke of Connaught's) Squadron AAC
	Located in Hampshire (Portsmouth and Middle Wallop).
	Created by the renaming of No. 655 Squadron AAC at Middle Wallop and then the transfer of D company of 3 PWRR.
	Paired with the Army Aviation Centre (AACen) at Middle Wallop.
	Provide ground support to Apache.
	Provide ground support to AACen training.
	Where capacity allows: assist 675 Sqn with the provision of helicopter handling teams.
	Support local community engagement.

See also

 List of Army Air Corps aircraft units

References

External links
 AAC website

Army Air Corps regiments
Military units and formations established in 2006